Martin (Lakota: pažóla otȟúŋwahe; "Knoll City") is a city and the county seat of Bennett County, South Dakota, United States. The population was 938 at the 2020 census.

History
Martin was laid out in 1911. The city was named for Eben Martin, a U.S. Representative from South Dakota.

Geography
Martin is located at  (43.174923, -101.734287).

Martin has been assigned the ZIP code 57551 and the FIPS place code 41100.

Infrastructure
One of the highways that passes through Martin is U.S. Route 18, in an east–west direction. South Dakota Highway 73 runs north into the town and makes a T-intersection with U.S. 18. State Highway 73 turns into Hisle Road after the T-intersection.

Demographics

2010 census
As of the census of 2010, there were 1,071 people, 401 households, and 246 families living in the city. The racial makeup of the city was 48.3% Native American, 41.6% White, 1.2% Asian, 0.1% African American, 0.5% from other races, and 8.3% from two or more races. Hispanic or Latino of any race were 4.1% of the population.

There were 401 households, of which 37.9% had children under the age of 18 living with them, 34.7% were married couples living together, 19.2% had a female householder with no husband present, 7.5% had a male householder with no wife present, and 38.7% were non-families. 32.7% of all households were made up of individuals, and 15.7% had someone living alone who was 65 years of age or older. The average household size was 2.58 and the average family size was 3.26.

The median age in the city was 31.7 years. 30.4% of residents were under the age of 18; 11.4% were between the ages of 18 and 24; 20.8% were from 25 to 44; 21.6% were from 45 to 64; and 15.8% were 65 years of age or older. The gender makeup of the city was 46.8% male and 53.2% female.

2000 census
As of the census of 2000, there were 1,106 people, 421 households, and 253 families living in the city. The population density was 1,210.5 people per square mile (469.3/km2). There were 480 housing units at an average density of 525.3 per square mile (203.7/km2). The racial makeup of the city was 53.98% White, 0.63% African American, 37.61% Native American, 0.09% Asian, 0.36% from other races, and 7.32% from two or more races. Hispanic or Latino of any race were 3.44% of the population.

There were 421 households, out of which 33.0% had children under the age of 18 living with them, 41.8% were married couples living together, 14.5% had a female householder with no husband present, and 39.7% were non-families. 35.6% of all households were made up of individuals, and 17.6% had someone living alone who was 65 years of age or older. The average household size was 2.51 and the average family size was 3.28.

In the city, the population was spread out, with 31.6% under the age of 18, 7.6% from 18 to 24, 23.1% from 25 to 44, 19.0% from 45 to 64, and 18.7% who were 65 years of age or older. The median age was 36 years. For every 100 females, there were 90.4 males. For every 100 females age 18 and over, there were 85.1 males.

As of 2000 the median income for a household in the city was $26,779, and the median income for a family was $32,500. Males had a median income of $26,964 versus $19,632 for females. The per capita income for the city was $13,752. About 19.0% of families and 24.9% of the population were below the poverty line, including 32.5% of those under age 18 and 14.2% of those age 65 or over.

Transportation
The only transportation for Martin is by road (U.S. 18, State Highway 73), or by air (Martin Municipal Airport).

Education
The Bennett County School District serves all of Bennett County.

Notable person
 Jay Novacek, an American football and College Football Hall of Fame tight end was born in Martin, South Dakota
Vine Deloria Jr

References

Cities in Bennett County, South Dakota
Cities in South Dakota
County seats in South Dakota
Populated places established in 1912
1912 establishments in South Dakota